The schraetzer (Gymnocephalus schraetser) or striped ruffe, is a species of perch native to the Danube basin. It is a schooling fish, being found over muddy or sandy bottoms of moderately flowing large rivers. While of no interest to commercial fisheries, it is popular as a game fish and is also frequently used as bait in pursuit of other species.

References

Gymnocephalus
Freshwater fish of Europe
Fish of Europe
Fish described in 1758
Taxa named by Carl Linnaeus
Taxonomy articles created by Polbot